Ride This Train is the sixth album by American country singer-songwriter Johnny Cash. It was originally released on August 1, 1960 and was re-issued on March 19, 2002, containing four additional bonus tracks.

It is considered Cash's first concept album. The album is billed as a "travelogue", with Cash providing spoken narration before each song to give context, in several cases playing historical characters, such as John Wesley Hardin, and describing different destinations around the United States visited by train. The songs themselves are not generally railroad-themed.

The success of this LP inspired his first label, Sun, to release the compilation LP All Aboard the Blue Train, which consisted of previously released "train"-inspired songs, including his hit "Folsom Prison Blues".

Ride This Train was included on the Bear Family box set Come Along and Ride This Train.


Track listing

Personnel
Johnny Cash - vocals, rhythm guitar
The Tennessee Two
Luther Perkins - lead guitar
Marshall Grant - bass
Additional musicians
Johnny Western - guitar
Shot Jackson - dobro, steel guitar
Gordon Terry - fiddle
Floyd Cramer - piano
Buddy Harman - drums
Technical
Don Law - Original Recording Producer
Al Quaglieri - Reissue Producer
Seth Foster - Mastering
Mark Wilder - Mastering, Mixing
Stacey Boyle - Tape Research
Matt Kelly - Tape Research
Kay Smith - Tape Research
Arthur Levy - Liner Notes
Darren Salmieri - A&R
Steven Berkowitz - A&R
Patti Matheny - A&R
Howard Fritzson - Art Direction
Alan Lomax - Adaptation, Arranger
Randall Martin - Design
Don Hunstein - Photography
Nick Shaffran - Series Consultant
Dick Miller - CD Art Adaptation

References 

Johnny Cash albums
1960 albums
Columbia Records albums
Concept albums
Fiction about rail transport